WatchMojo is a private company in video producing, publishing and syndicator that is based in Canada. The company has created around 20,000  videos on YouTube and 5,000 additional videos from other platforms. It is primarily known for their top ten lists pertaining to entertainment and pop culture and has a large presence on YouTube. WatchMojo has around 30 million subscribers with a peak of 110 million viewers. In more recent years, WatchMojo has included separate channels including: Ms.Mojo,  MojoPlays,  WatchMojo UK, and WatchMojo Russia.

Statistics 
Sixty percent of its YouTube channel viewers and subscribers are male, and 92% are from the United States. Including its international editions like WatchMojo Español and vertical channels like MsMojo, it has over 40 million subscribers. Its global reach when measured by unique monthly viewers has grown from 115 million by September 2018 to 150 million by January 2019. 

Throughout the first three months of 2019, its reach grew to 250 million unique viewers across YouTube, Snapchat, Facebook and several other platforms. As of April 2020, WatchMojo's YouTube channels generated over 100 billion minutes of watch time.

History 
According to the company's biography, The 10-Year Overnight Success: An Entrepreneurship's Manifesto – How WatchMojo Built the Most Successful Media Brand, WatchMojo's vision is to "inform and entertain," with a mission to produce "a video on every topic." After spending the first half of the 2000s writing hundreds of columns on entertainment, lifestyle and history and publishing two books, company founder Ashkan Karbasfrooshan created WatchMojo to produce videos that were of higher quality than the user-generated fare found on most websites, but in a format, style, length and tone that catered to Internet viewers' tastes. As such, WatchMojo.com was founded in January 2006 by Ashkan Karbasfrooshan, Raphael Daigneault, and Christine Voulieris. Other early key employees include Kevin Havill and Derek Allen. The WatchMojo.com website was launched on January 23, 2006, and its YouTube channel was launched on January 25, 2007. Alex Lefebvre, a former colleague of Karbasfrooshan's, joined in 2008 as CTO and head of design after spending a decade at AskMen and IGN. Originally the content featured hosts and vlog-style presentations, but over the years the programming shifted to more polished visuals featuring voice-overs.

WatchMojo is an independent channel; it is neither a Multi-Channel Network (MCN) nor part of one. According to the CEO Karbasfrooshan, WatchMojo employed 23 full-time employees and a team of 100-plus freelance writers and video editors by October 2014. By March 2017, the amount reached over 50.

The videos it produces are typically submitted and voted on by visitors on its suggestion tool, as well as ideas suggested on its YouTube, Facebook, and Twitter pages. As the activity on its YouTube channel comments' section grew, WatchMojo designed and built the suggest tool to centralize voter submissions. The suggest tool has garnered 10 million votes across the 2.5 million list entries on 500,000 video ideas suggested by the 250,000 users who have signed up for the feature.

On its main YouTube channel, it hit 1 million subscribers on October 30, 2013, and then 5 million subscribers on August 29, 2014. In December 2014, on the day its YouTube channel surpassed 6 million subscribers, it announced a representation deal with talent agency William Morris Endeavor. It surpassed 10 million subscribers on December 5, 2015. The 15 millionth subscriber was registered on July 29, 2017. Across the company's other channels (JrMojo, MsMojo, and the non-English international editions), the WatchMojo Network has over 40 million subscribers.

During the 2016–17 regular season of the NHL, WatchMojo sponsored the New York Islanders. In October 2016, Karbasfrooshan published The 10-Year Overnight Success: An Entrepreneurship's Manifesto – How WatchMojo Built the Most Successful Media Brand on YouTube on the company's new publishing imprint, as it ventured into digital books and guides.

In August 2017, WatchMojo was accused of plagiarism in a video. WatchMojo explained that the company relies on its suggest tool as inspiration for many of its videos, and uses a large base of freelance writers, conceding that the company needs to relentlessly educate its writers regarding proper crediting to avoid accusations of plagiarism.

In autumn 2017, the company unveiled a handful of channels in mainland China in partnership with Weibo.

The company's advisory board includes former AOL executive and NatGeo president Ted Prince as well as former DMG Entertainment exec Chris Fenton.

Content 

The company averages over 5 minutes of watch time per video, far above industry standard. It does not feature user-generated content nor does it allow a mechanism for users to upload videos onto its site. The website produces daily "Top Ten" videos as well as videos summarizing the history of specific niche topics. These topics can be one of 16 categories: Anime, automotive, business, comedy, education, fashion, film, health and fitness, lifestyle, music, parenting, politics and economy, space and science, sports, technology, travel, and video games. Each day it publishes over five videos for 60–75 minutes of original content. The company’s videos are narrated by Rebecca Brayton & Young Deuces. In February 2016, it launched the MsMojo channel to better serve female viewers and fans. It also launched multiple non-English channels for the Spanish, French, German, Italian, Turkish, Polish and Hungarian markets.

In April 2017, it launched the JrMojo channel for toddlers and kids.

On April 15, 2017, WatchMojo debuted The Lineup, a game show that combined ranking top 10 lists with elements of a fantasy draft and sports talk radio banter. It won a Telly Award for Best Series in the Web Series category.

On May 31, 2017, WatchMojo live-streamed its first live show, called WatchMojo Live at YouTube Space at Chelsea Market. The show consisted of an afternoon industry track covering online media, advertising, and VR. It was then followed by an evening show featuring DJ Killa Jewel, DJ Dan Deacon, Puddles Pity Party and Caveman.

In June 2017, it launched WatchMojo UK, a channel that focuses on pop culture, entertainment, music, TV, movies and sports based in and around the United Kingdom.

On July 12, 2017, it followed up with WatchMojo Live at YouTube Space in London at King's Cross Station, featuring musical acts by Llew Eyre, Bluey Robinson and Leif Erikson. Speakers at the industry track included Hussain Manawer, Ben Jones and Kim Snow.

In addition to video programming, it has ventured into digital books and guides. Titles under the WatchMojo Publishing unit include Top 10 Anime of All Time, 50 Most Influential Sci-Fi Shows on TV, Read-Only: A Collection of Digital Horror, 75 Most Influential Horror Films of All Time, 50 Most Influential Comics of the 1980s, Top 100 Music Videos of the 2000s, 100 Decade-Defining Movie Movements of the 1990s, as well as its 10-year Special Edition Magazine and 10-Year Overnight Success book covering the company's history and rise of YouTube as a dominant video platform.

In December 2017, it launched The WORST Travel Show on Facebook Watch, a semi-scripted travel comedy series chronicling establishments which have been maligned in online reviews.

In January 2018, it launched MojoPlays, a channel based around video games, and by April 2018 it recruited former IGN host Naomi Kyle as host.

It subsequently launched the MojoTalks channel to cover pop culture, entertainment and media news as it continued to expand into other formats than its top 10 lists, including talk and trivia formats.

It expanded into the Science category through the March 2018 acquisition of Unveiled.

In April 2018, WatchMojo proactively updated its catalog by sunsetting a number of videos which it didn't feel met its and YouTube's brand-safety standards.

By 2019, it expanded on its trivia offerings by launching a trivia app.

In April 2019, With an extensive library of videos that rely on fair use – released a video that relied on its 10-year experiences managing claims and strikes via Content ID to highlight instances of alleged abuse. In a follow-up video, the channel estimated that rights holders had unlawfully claimed over $2 billion from 2014 to 2019. (See also Content ID)

In an appearance on Bloomberg BNN in February 2019 with host Jon Ehrlichman, Karbasfrooshan announced the launch of a new brand focused on business with an emphasis on entrepreneurship called Context (Eventually ContextTV). The company published its first documentary called Fox in the Henhouse on the ContextTV channel. The documentary explored the role of entrepreneurship to bridge the wealth gap at a time when young voters are drawn to socialism and billionaire capitalists are ringing alarm bells about income inequality

It live-streamed the Saturn Awards on September 13, 2019.

Three years after launching the award-winning gameshow The Lineup, it released What the List?

Channels
WatchMojo has numerous YouTube channels, they consist of:

Business model 
WatchMojo.com lost money the first six years of operations, broke even in 2012, and has generated a profit since 2013. Due to the 2007–2009 recession, WatchMojo.com had de-emphasized an ad-supported model in favour of licensing fees paid by other media companies to access and use their media. Later that year Beet.TV featured WatchMojo.com alongside Magnify.net as examples of companies which successfully switched from ad-based revenue models to licensing fee based revenue models.

In 2012, it shifted its focus to YouTube and as a result of its growth in subscribers and views, it became profitable. In addition, WatchMojo licenses its content to Verizon's Aol and Go90 platforms, DailyMotion, Facebook and others. Many academic institutions and educational publishers use the company's programming in ESL programs as well as K-12 curriculum. WatchMojo encourages educators and students to use videos in its catalogue that are pertinent and complementary to their studies as part of presentations.

In 2016, Ernst & Young awarded Karbasfrooshan with the Entrepreneur of the Year in the Media & Entertainment category, for the Quebec region, following in the footsteps of Cirque du Soleil's Guy Laliberte, who won it previously.

In March 2018, it acquired the Unveiled channel as its first acquisition. In September 2019, it invested in the Buffer festival which showcases digital creators.

WatchMojo is represented by Los Angeles-based ICM Partners.

Philanthropy 
In July 2019, WatchMojo host Rebecca Brayton and CEO Ashkan Karbasfrooshan discussed the company's plans to donate to various charitable causes. In November 2020, WatchMojo introduced Mojo Gives, citing a desire and responsibility to honor celebrities that had died while giving to causes that its employees supported.

References

External links
 WatchMojo.com
 WatchMojo on YouTube

Companies based in Montreal
Internet properties established in 2006
2006 establishments in Quebec
Internet television channels
Online companies of Canada
YouTube channels
YouTube channels launched in 2007
2000s YouTube series
2010s YouTube series
2020s YouTube series
Entertainment companies of Canada
Entertainment companies established in 2006